Ivan Trichkovski (born 18 April 1987) is a Macedonian professional footballer who plays for and captains AEK Larnaca in the Cypriot First Division.

Club career

Red Star Belgrade
Trichkovski joined Red Star Belgrade in January 2008 for a fee of around €800,000 from FK Rabotnički. He actually faced his future team (APOEL) in the 2008–09 UEFA Cup while playing for Red Star, and ended up on the losing side in a dramatic 3–3 draw in Belgrade which saw APOEL progress on away goals with a late equalizer in the 116th minute.

APOEL
Trichkovski spent the 2009–10 season on loan at Enosis Neon Paralimni where he scored 8 goals in 29 appearances and caught the eye of a successful club in Cyprus, APOEL, who agreed in principle to a three-year deal with Trickovski in May 2010. It is believed that the transfer fee which was paid to Red Star Belgrade was in the region of €300,000. In December 2010, the Belgian club Lokeren made an official offer of €1.2 million for Trickovski but APOEL rejected it. Trichkovski became a champion in his first season in APOEL, by helping the club to win the 2010–11 Cypriot First Division. The next season, he appeared in all but one APOEL's 2011–12 UEFA Champions League matches (from group stages to quarter-finals) and he scored one goal against Shakhtar Donetsk in Donbass Arena on 28 September 2011, by opening the score on 61st minute, in a group stage match which ended with 1–1 draw. He also appeared in the round-of-16 triumph over Olympique Lyonnais where he converted his attempt in the penalty shootout.

Club Brugge
On 20 July 2013, he completed a move to Waasland-Beveren, on a season-long loan deal from Club Brugge.

AEK Larnaca
In 2016, Trichkovski joined Cypriot First Division club AEK Larnaca. On 1 August 2019, he scored a career-high four goals in a 4–0 away win over Bulgarian club Levski Sofia in a second qualifying round UEFA Europa League match.

International career
For the U17, Trichkovski scored against Italy on 21 September 2003, a 2004 UEFA European Under-17 Football Championship qualifier, and Luxembourg on 25 September 2003.

Trichkovski also played for the U19 side. He scored a goal against Azerbaijan on 28 September 2004, a U-19 Euro Championship qualifying match., Armenia on 30 September 2004., France on 2 October 2004. He also played for his country in the 2006 UEFA European Under-19 Football Championship qualifiers.

Trichkovski was an established member of the Macedonia national under-21 football team before he was called up in February 2008 for the senior squad to face Serbia in a friendly, but he was forced to withdraw due to injury. He scored on his debut with the national team on 29 May 2010 against Azerbaijan with a volley, as Macedonia went on to win 3–1. He scored his second goal for Macedonia on 11 August 2010 against Malta. As of May 2020, he has earned a total of 56 caps, scoring 5 goals.

Career statistics

Club

International
Scores and results list Macedonia's goal tally first.

Honours
APOEL
Cypriot First Division: 2010–11
Cypriot Super Cup: 2011

Al-Nasr
UAE President's Cup: 2014–15
UAE Arabian Gulf Cup: 2014–15

Legia Warsaw
Ekstraklasa: 2015–16

AEK Larnaca
Cypriot Cup: 2017–18
Cypriot Super Cup: 2018

References

External links
Profile at Macedonian Football

1987 births
Living people
Footballers from Skopje
Association football forwards
Macedonian footballers
North Macedonia youth international footballers
North Macedonia under-21 international footballers
North Macedonia international footballers
FK Vardar players
FK Rabotnički players
Red Star Belgrade footballers
Enosis Neon Paralimni FC players
APOEL FC players
Club Brugge KV players
S.K. Beveren players
Al-Nasr SC (Dubai) players
Legia Warsaw players
AEK Larnaca FC players
Macedonian First Football League players
Serbian SuperLiga players
Cypriot First Division players
Belgian Pro League players
UAE Pro League players
Ekstraklasa players
UEFA Euro 2020 players
Macedonian expatriate footballers
Expatriate footballers in Serbia
Macedonian expatriate sportspeople in Serbia
Expatriate footballers in Cyprus
Macedonian expatriate sportspeople in Cyprus
Expatriate footballers in Belgium
Macedonian expatriate sportspeople in Belgium
Expatriate footballers in the United Arab Emirates
Expatriate footballers in Poland
Macedonian expatriate sportspeople in Poland
Macedonian expatriate sportspeople in the United Arab Emirates